Medina is an unincorporated community in Bandera County, Texas, United States. It is part of the San Antonio Metropolitan Statistical Area. Medina is famous for its apples. The community's population was estimated to be 515 in 2000.

History
Several families had settled in the community and a sawmill was built in Medina around 1865. A post office was established at Medina in 1880 and developed a gin, a corn mill, a hotel, a private bank, three general stores, and two churches serving 150 residents by the end of the next decade. Many residents were farmers who raised livestock. The population of Medina jumped to 400 by 1914, which then plunged to 250 when the Great Depression forced people to search for new jobs in the early 1930s. It did manage to recover from the Great Depression, with the population growing to 475 by the late 1940s with several businesses and four churches. Besides raising livestock, residents also had recreational hunting leases up until apple farming was brought to the area in the 1980s. A man named Baxter Adams, Jr. began an apple orchard consisting of dwarf apple trees in 1980, with the first apples being sold four years later. These trees grew normal-sized apples that were 40% sweeter than the ones grown on larger trees, which proved to be an efficient use of land. There were about 1,000 to 2,500 trees each acre, which equated to about 300,000 apple trees in the community. They produced 100 tons of apples in 1990 and more orchards were planted in the future years. Medina was declared to be the Apple Capital of Texas by the Texas Department of Agriculture in 1989. That next year, Medina introduced the Medina Apple Festival that is held on the last Saturday in July and attracts about 20,000 visitors annually. The population of Medina was reported to be 515 that same year, but the population of the Medina city proper was estimated to be 250. Its population was officially estimated to be 515 in 2000.

Although it is unincorporated, Medina has a post office, with the ZIP code of 78055.

Geography

Climate
The climate in this area is characterized by hot, humid summers and generally mild to cool winters. According to the Köppen Climate Classification system, Medina has a humid subtropical climate, abbreviated "Cfa" on climate maps.

Education
Medina is served by the Medina Independent School District and home to the Medina High School Bobcats. This is one of the school districts in Bandera County, in addition to Bandera Independent School District and a small portion of Northside Independent School District.

See also

References

Greater San Antonio
Unincorporated communities in Bandera County, Texas
Unincorporated communities in Texas